Marek Halter is a French writer and activist, known best for his historical novels, which have been translated into English, Polish, Hebrew, and many other languages.

Biography

He was born in Warsaw, Poland in 1936. During World War II, he and his parents escaped from the Warsaw Ghetto and fled to the Soviet Union, spending the remainder of the war in Ukraine, Moscow and finally in Kokand, in Uzbekistan.

In 1945 he was chosen to travel to Moscow to present flowers to Joseph Stalin. In 1946 the family returned to Poland and in 1950, they emigrated to France, taking up residence in Paris.

In 1946, he returned to Poland with his family, but he left for Paris in 1950, when he was fourteen, and  studied  pantomime under Marcel Marceau. He was admitted to the École nationale des beaux-arts to study painting.  
In  1954, he received the Deauville international prize, and was also awarded a prize at the Biennale d'Ancone. His first international exhibit was in 1955 in Buenos Aires, and he remained in that city for two years, returning to France in 1957, where he engaged in political journalism and advocacy.

In 1991 Halter organized the French College in Moscow.  he remained the president of the college.

Halter has also been subject to controversy in recent years. French magazines Le Point and Le Nouvel Observateur have accused him of lying about several parts of his life.

Literary career

In 1968, he founded together with his wife, Clara Halter, the magazine Élements, which published equally works by Israeli, Palestinian, and Arab writers.
  
His first book, a political autobiography, Le Fou et les Rois (The Jester and the Kings) was awarded the Prix Aujourd'hui in 1976.

Other novels include The Messiah, The Mysteries of Jerusalem, The Book of Abraham (1986) and its sequel, The Children of Abraham (1990), The Wind of the Khazars (2003) —a piece of historical fiction about the Khazars, a nomadic kingdom of Turkic people in the Caucasus who converted to Judaism—, Sarah (2004), Zipporah (2005), Lilah (2006), and Mary of Nazareth (2008).

Nonfiction works include: 
The Jester And the Kings: a Political Biography (1989) 
Stories of Deliverance: Speaking with Men And Women Who Rescued Jews from the Holocaust (1998)

References

External links

 

1936 births
Living people
Warsaw Ghetto inmates
20th-century French novelists
21st-century French novelists
French historical novelists
Jewish novelists
Prix du Livre Inter winners
Polish emigrants to France
Writers of historical fiction set in antiquity
Officiers of the Légion d'honneur
Commandeurs of the Ordre des Arts et des Lettres
Recipients of the Gold Medal for Merit to Culture – Gloria Artis
Paris Match writers
French male novelists
20th-century French male writers
21st-century French male writers